Luca Ferro (born 28 August 1978 in Savona) is an Italian footballer who plays for Swiss club Yverdon-Sport FC as a goalkeeper.

He has played in Serie B and the Swiss Challenge League. He made his debut in the Swiss Super League on 23 April 2009 and kept a clean sheet for Neuchâtel Xamax in a goalless draw against Young Boys Bern at the Stade de Suisse in Bern.

External links

1978 births
Living people
People from Savona
Italian footballers
FC La Chaux-de-Fonds players
Genoa C.F.C. players
S.S. Arezzo players
Neuchâtel Xamax FCS players
Yverdon-Sport FC players
SR Delémont players
Swiss Super League players
Association football goalkeepers
Italian expatriate footballers
Expatriate footballers in Switzerland
Italian expatriate sportspeople in Switzerland
Neuchâtel Xamax FCS non-playing staff
FC Sion non-playing staff
Footballers from Liguria
Sportspeople from the Province of Savona